Goodbye, My Fancy is a 1948 play by Fay Kanin. A comedy in 3 Acts and 4 scenes, the work premiered at the Grand Theatre in London, Ontario on October 21, 1948 for tryout performances before the production moved to Broadway in New York City. The work premiered on Broadway on November 17, 1948 at the Morosco Theatre.

The original production was staged by Sam Wanamaker and produced by Michael Kanin, Richard Aldrich, and Richard Myers. Donald Oenslager designed the production's sets and lights, and Emeline Roche designed the costumes. The cast was led by Madeleine Carroll as Agatha Reed, Bethel Leslie as Ginny Merrill, Conrad Nagel as James Merrill, Shirley Booth as Grace Woods, George Mitchell as Dr. Pitt, Lulu Mae Hubbard as Ellen Griswold, Eda Heinemann as Miss Shackleford, and Wanamaker as Matt Cole. Booth won the Tony Award for Best Featured Actress in a Play for her performance in 1949 at the 3rd Tony Awards.

Adaptations
The play was adapted into a 1951 film of the same name starring Joan Crawford. In 1952 a radio version of the play was broadcast on Lux Radio Theatre starring Barbara Stanwyck and Robert Young.

References

External links
Goodbye, My Fancy at IBDB

1948 plays
Broadway plays